George Cotterill may refer to:
 George Cotterill (footballer), English footballer
 George F. Cotterill, mayor of Seattle
 George Edward Cotterill, English cricketer

See also
 George Cottrell, British financier and convicted felon
 George Cottrell (rugby), English rugby union and rugby league player